Sharon Marie Ferris (born 17 January 1974 in Scarborough, Ontario, Canada) is an Olympic sailor for New Zealand.

Ferris competed at the 1996 and 2004 Olympics.

She sailed on Amer Sports Too in the 2001–02 Volvo Ocean Race.

References

1974 births
Living people
21st-century New Zealand people
New Zealand female sailors (sport)
Canadian emigrants to New Zealand
Olympic sailors of New Zealand
Sportspeople from Scarborough, Toronto
Sailors at the 1996 Summer Olympics – Europe
Sailors at the 2004 Summer Olympics – Yngling
Volvo Ocean Race sailors